Cochlespira travancorica is a species of sea snail, a marine gastropod mollusk in the family Cochlespiridae.

Description
The size of an adult shell varies between 20 mm and 40 mm.

(Original description) The smooth shell is narrowly fusiform. The colour is a dull white under a thin greyish periostracum. The shell contains 7 whorls. The tall teleoconch is pagodaform. The whorls, at about three-fourths whorl height, are sharply angulated and coronated by a thin lamella which is produced into somewhat irregular upward curved broad based spines. Above the carina the shoulder is concave. From the carina to the lower suture the outlines are straight but inclined inward below. The lines of growth are finely striated. The body whorl is carinate a little below the dentate periphery and tapers gradually to a long straight siphonal canal which is obliquely striated. The narrow aperture continues into the siphonal canal. The outer lip is slender . The broad and deep sinus is profoundly arcuated above the peripheral carina and extending into the suture.

Distribution
This species occurs in the Indian Ocean off India and Mozambique.

References

 Annandale and Stewart, Illustr. Zool. Investigator, Moll., pt. 6, pi. 7, figs. 1, la.

External links
 

travancorica